Galeoscypha is a genus of fungi in the family Pyronemataceae. It is monotypic, containing the single species Galeoscypha pileiformis.

External links
Index Fungorum

Pyronemataceae
Monotypic Ascomycota genera